Chlorophyll f (Chl f) is a type form of chlorophyll that absorbs further in the red (infrared light) than other chlorophylls. In 2010, it was reported by Min_Chen_(biologist) from stromatolites from Western Australia's Shark Bay.

The function of Chl f in photosynthetic reactions is uncertain and the ecological distribution of Chl f remains unknown. Chl f has been shown to support some of the roles in photosynthetic reactions, in both the energy transfer and in the charge separation processes.

Chl f is produced from chlorophyllide f by chlorophyll synthase. Chlorophyllide f is made from chlorophyllide a by an enzyme known as PsbA4 or ChlF.

References 

Tetrapyrroles
Photosynthetic pigments